Oncoba spinosa, the snuff-box tree, fried egg tree or fried-egg flower, is a plant species in the genus Oncoba. 

It is a small to medium-sized deciduous tree (usually no more than 5m in height) that has simple leaves.
The blossoms are white and attractive with a yellow centre due to the stamens, resembling a fried egg. They appear on the tree from just before or around the time the new leaves are produced and the tree is in bloom for up to three months. The fruit is hardshelled, globose and has a pointed tip. It measures up to 80mm in diameter and is yellow to reddish-brown in colour. In southern Africa, it blooms from September to December. 
The tree is widely distributed along the eastern side of Africa as far as South Africa, mainly in dry woodland or open savanna in a wide range of sites from river valleys to rocky hills. Its northernmost limit is reached on the eastern side of the Red Sea in Arabia.

See also
 List of Southern African indigenous trees and woody lianes

References

External links
 Oncoba spinosa on www.plantzafrica.com

spinosa